San Marcos is a town, with a population of 6,836 (2013 census), and a municipality in the Honduran department of Ocotepeque.

This municipality of 22,000 people is located in Western Honduras bordering Guatemala and El Salvador. It's situated between the highest point in Honduras, Mount Meredon, and the Rio Grande and Suntulin Rivers. It was founded by Spanish and Belgian gold miners. San Marcos de Ocotepeque is a bustle of cultural activity ranging from plays to literary events.

Demographics
At the time of the 2013 Honduras census, San Marcos municipality had a population of 19,978. Of these, 98.27% were Mestizo, 0.89% White, 0.50% Indigenous, 0.30% Black or Afro-Honduran and 0.05% others.

References

Sources 
Honduras Coffee
Honduran Specialty Coffee

Municipalities of the Ocotepeque Department